Hapoel Bu'eine is an Israeli football club based in Bu'eine Nujeidat. The club is currently in Liga Alef North A division.

History
The club played in the lower divisions of Israeli football from the 1960s and enjoyed a brief spell in Liga Bet, then fourth tier, between 1993–94 and 1998–99, before relegating back to Liga Gimel and folding.
The club was re-established in 2010 and was promoted to Liga Bet in 2013. In 2015–16 finished second in its division and qualified to the promotion play-offs, advancing to the regional finals to Hapoel Umm al-Fahm.

Honours

League

External links
Hapoel Bu'eine  The Israel Football Association

References

Football clubs in Israel
Bu'eine
Association football clubs established in 2014
2014 establishments in Israel
Arab-Israeli football clubs